John Swab is a film director, screenwriter, and producer born in Tulsa, Oklahoma.

Film career 
His first feature Let Me Make You a Martyr, was released in 2017, and starred Mark Boone Junior, Marilyn Manson, Sam Quartin and Niko Nicotera

He wrote, produced, and directed Run with the Hunted starring Michael Pitt, Sam Quartin, Ron Perlman, Mark Boone Junior, William Forsythe, and Dree Hemingway

He wrote, produced, and directed Body Brokers, which stars Melissa Leo, Michael K. Williams, Frank Grillo, Jack Kilmer, Alice Englert, Jessica Rothe, Owen Campbell, Sam Quartin, Thomas Dekker and Peter Greene.

He wrote and directed Ida Red, which stars Melissa Leo, Josh Hartnett, Frank Grillo, William Forsythe, Sofia Hublitz, Deborah Ann Woll, Slaine, and Beau Knapp.

His film, Candy Land, stars Olivia Luccardi, Sam Quartin, Owen Campbell, Eden Brolin, and William Baldwin.

Personal life 
Swab married musician Sam Quartin on November 5, 2017, and they live in Woodstock, New York.

Filmography

Film

Short films

References 

Living people
1988 births
Film directors from Oklahoma
Writers from Tulsa, Oklahoma
Screenwriters from Oklahoma
American male screenwriters
21st-century American screenwriters
21st-century American male writers